Peter Schaufuss (born 1949 in Copenhagen, Denmark) is a Danish ballet dancer, director and choreographer.

Biography
He is the son of ballet dancers Frank Schaufuss (1921–1997) and Mona Vangsaae (1920–1983).

Schaufuss trained at the Royal Danish Ballet School from age seven, and then joined the Royal Danish Ballet. 

He was artistic director of the English National Ballet 1984 to 1990, and Berlin Ballet from 1990 to 1994. From 1994 to 1995, he was artistic director of the Royal Danish Ballet. In 1988 he founded English National Ballet School.

He was Knighted in Denmark for his services to the arts in 1988.

In 1997, he founded the Peter Schaufuss Ballet, based in Holstebro, Denmark.

Schaufuss owns Rose Theatre, The Basement Theatre and Saint Stephens in the Scottish capital Edinburgh.

References

1949 births
Living people
Danish male ballet dancers
Knights of the Order of the Dannebrog
Royal Danish Ballet dancers
People from Copenhagen
English National Ballet
20th-century Danish dancers